Neptis livingstonei is a butterfly in the family Nymphalidae. It is found in Tanzania.

References

Butterflies described in 1904
livingstonei
Endemic fauna of Tanzania
Butterflies of Africa